Sister of Mercy (French: La petite soeur des pauvres) is a 1929 French silent drama film directed by George Pallu and starring Desdemona Mazza, Georges Melchior, and Lucette Martell.

Cast
Desdemona Mazza
Georges Melchior
Lucette Martell
Monsieur de Saint-André
Cécile Didier
Frédéric Mariotti as Le jardinier
Rainaldi
Edmée Colson
Florial

References

Bibliography
  Philippe Renard. Un cinéaste français des années cinquante : Jean-Paul Le Chanois. Dreamland, 2000.

External links 
 

1929 films
1929 drama films
French drama films
French silent films
1920s French-language films
Films directed by George Pallu
French black-and-white films
Silent drama films
1920s French films